Anabel Medina Garrigues and Arantxa Parra Santonja were the defending champions, but chose not to participate this year.

Darija Jurak and Anastasia Rodionova won the title, defeating Verónica Cepede Royg and Mariana Duque Mariño in the final, 6–3, 6–2.

Seeds

Draw

References
 Main Draw

2017 Abierto Mexicano Telcel